The 1903 Nobel Prize in Literature was the third prestigious literary prize based upon Alfred Nobel's will, which awarded to the Norwegian poet and politician Bjørnstjerne Bjørnson (1832–1910) "as a tribute to his noble, magnificent and versatile poetry, which has always been distinguished by both the freshness of its inspiration and the rare purity of its spirit." The prize was announced in October 08, 1903 and was given in December 10, 1903 at Stockholm.

Laureate

Bjørnson was a Norwegian multifaceted literary person who became one of the original members of the Norwegian Nobel Committee, that awards the Nobel Peace Prize, where he sat from 1901 to 1906. He wrote poetry, drama and lyrical poetry. He worked for periods as theater director in both Bergen and Oslo, and he was active both politically and as a journalist. In his early works he depicted peasant life in the Norwegian countryside. This national romanticism was also found in his poetry throughout his career, even if he also wrote both realistic and symbolic dramas. Bjørnson's musical version of the poem "Ja, vi elsker dette landet" became Norway's national anthem. He is also considered to be one of the four great Norwegian writers, alongside Henrik Ibsen, Jonas Lie, and Alexander Kielland.

Deliberations

Nominations
The Swedish Academy received four nominations – two nominations each in 1902 and 1903 – for Bjørnstjerne Bjørnson before getting awarded. 

In total, the Nobel Committee received 43 nominations for 25 individuals in 1903, including repeated nominations for the Russian novelist Leo Tolstoy (four nominations) and Norwegian playwright Henrik Ibsen (one nomination), and with new nominations for the English writers Algernon Charles Swinburne and Rudyard Kipling (one nominations each). Kipling would later be awarded in 1907. French writer Anatole France and Fredrik Wulff were the first nominators to nominate a collective group of writers purposely for a shared prize. France nominated Tolstoy, Brandes, and Maeterlinck in one nomination, whereas Wulff nominated Paris and Mistral together.

The authors Ada Ellen Bayly, Nicolaas Beets, Eugenio María de Hostos, Girolamo de Rada, Frederic Farrar, George Gissing, William Ernest Henley, Ernest Legouvé, Vicente Fidel López, Evgeny Markov, Mary Anne Sadlier, Joseph Henry Shorthouse, Joseph Skipsey,Carl Snoilsky, Richard Henry Stoddard, Aleksandr Sukhovo-Kobylin, Wilhelm von Polenz, Sydir Vorobkevych, Otto Weininger, Josefina Wettergrund died in 1903 without having been nominated for the prize.

References

External links
Award ceremony speech by C.D. af Wirsén nobelprize.org

1903